Mbouanatsa is a village in the commune of Bouéni in Mayotte.

References

Populated places in Mayotte